The Crozet Historic District is a national historic district located in Crozet, Albemarle County, Virginia.  The historic district was listed on the National Register of Historic Places on November 28, 2012.  It includes 227 properties deemed to contribute to the historic character of the area along with 73 additional non-contributing properties for a total of 300 properties. They include representative examples of the mid-19th century Greek Revival and Gothic Revival styles, late-Victorian Italianate, Queen Anne, and Victorian styles and from the late-19th century- and early-20th century, Colonial Revival, Tudor Revival, Bungalow/Craftsman and Commercial styles.  The district also includes examples of modern-era Postmodern style.

References

Colonial Revival architecture in Virginia
Historic districts in Albemarle County, Virginia
National Register of Historic Places in Albemarle County, Virginia
Crozet, Virginia
Historic districts on the National Register of Historic Places in Virginia